C77 may refer to :
 Ruy Lopez chess openings ECO code
 Honda C71, C76, C72, C77 Dream, motorcycle different models
 Secondary and unspecified malignant neoplasm of lymph nodes ICD-10 code
 London Underground C69 and C77 Stock trains
 Honda C77, a motorcycle
 Oil Fuel Hulk C77, other name of HMS Warrior (1860)
 Poplar Grove Airport FAA LID
 Medical Examination of Young Persons (Industry) Convention, 1946 code
 Caldwell 77 (Centaurus A), a galaxy in the constellation Centaurus

C-77 may refer to :
 C-77 (Michigan county highway)
 Cessna C-77, a four seats utility and cargo transport aircraft